Nakazawa (written: , ,  or ) is a Japanese surname. Notable people with the surname include:

 Ayumu Nakazawa, Japanese voice actor
 Daisuke Nakazawa, sushi chef
 Kazuto Nakazawa (born 1968), Japanese animator
 Kei Nakazawa (born 1959), Japanese writer and professor
 Keiji Nakazawa (born 1939), Japanese manga artist and writer
 Kyle Nakazawa (born 1988), Japanese-American football player
, Japanese actor, voice actor and singer
 Michael Nakazawa, a professional wrestler
 Sae Nakazawa (born 1983), Japanese judoka
 Shinya Nakazawa, Japanese race car driver
 Takumi Nakazawa (born 1976), Japanese video game writer
, Japanese footballer
 Yuji Nakazawa (born 1978), Japanese football player
 Yuko Nakazawa (born 1973), Japanese J-pop singer

Japanese-language surnames